Lovely Jubbly is the fourth studio album by Japanese group Field of View. The album was released on August 25, 1999 on Zain Records. The album reached #24 on the Oricon charts for first week and sold more than 15,350 copies. It charted for 2 weeks and sold more than 20,000 copies in total.

Track listing

References 

1999 albums
Being Inc. albums
Japanese-language albums
Field of View albums